Renato Medeiros de Almeida (commonly known as Renato Medeiros, born 4 February 1982 in Brasília) is a Brazilian football midfielder who currently plays for São Raimundo.

References

External links
 

1982 births
Living people
Brazilian footballers
Muscat Club players
Expatriate footballers in Oman
Expatriate footballers in Iran
Expatriate footballers in South Korea
Association football midfielders
Brazilian expatriate footballers
Sanat Naft Abadan F.C. players
Renato
Associação Atlética Ponte Preta players
Associação Atlética Portuguesa (Santos) players
Renato
Brazilian expatriate sportspeople in Oman
Brazilian expatriate sportspeople in Iran
Brazilian expatriate sportspeople in South Korea
Footballers from Brasília